United Internet Team Germany is a yacht racing team that competed for the Louis Vuitton Cup 2007, the challenger series held prior to the America's Cup.

They planned to compete in the Louis Vuitton Pacific Series in 2009. However, they withdrew due to financial Problems as Audi canceled their sponsorship.

External links
Official Website

America's Cup teams
2005 establishments in Germany